Tobias Benjamin Unger (born 10 July 1979 ) is a retired German track and field athlete who competed in sprints.

Biography
Unger comes from Wendlingen am Neckar and studied sport science at the University of Tübingen and trained in Ludwigsburg. His trainer is the Romanian Micky Corucle. He was the tenth fastest 200 m runner in 2005, and the second fastest European that year. His personal bests in his two disciplines are 10.14 seconds (100 m) and 20.20 seconds (200 m).

Unger represented Germany at the 2008 Summer Olympics. In Beijing he competed in the 100 metres sprint and placed 4th in his heat behind Churandy Martina, Naoki Tsukahara and Simeon Williamson, normally causing elimination. However his time of 10.46 was the 10th fastest losing time, giving him a spot in the second round. There he improved his time to 10.36 seconds, but he was unable to qualify for the semifinals as he finished 7th place in his heat. Together with Till Helmke, Alexander Kosenkow and Martin Keller he also competed at the 4x100 metres relay. In their qualification heat they placed third behind Jamaica and Canada, but in front of China. Their time of 38.93 was the sixth-fastest out of sixteen participating nations in the first round, and they qualified for the final. There they sprinted to a time of 38.58 seconds, which was the fifth-best time.

Honours 
 Third in the 1998 junior World Championships relay
 German youth champion 2000
 Second place in the German Championships in 2001
 Seventh in the U-23 European Championships in 2001
 German champion in 2003
 Participant at the 2003 World Championships in Athletics
 German champion in 2004
 German indoor champion in 2004 (60 m, 200 m)
 Seventh place in the 2004 Summer Olympics in Athens (200 m)
 Bronze medal in the Indoor World Championships 2004
 Indoor European Champion 2005
 Double German champion in 2005 (100 metres, with a personal best time of 10.16 s; 200 metres, breaking Frank Emmelmann's national record with a time of 20.20)
 Seventh place in the 2005 World Championships, with a time of 20.81 s over 200 m

See also
 German all-time top lists - 100 metres
 German all-time top lists - 200 metres

References

External links 
 Official website 
 

1979 births
Living people
Sportspeople from Munich
University of Tübingen alumni
German male sprinters
German national athletics champions
Athletes (track and field) at the 2004 Summer Olympics
Athletes (track and field) at the 2008 Summer Olympics
Athletes (track and field) at the 2012 Summer Olympics
Olympic athletes of Germany
European Athletics Championships medalists
World Athletics Indoor Championships medalists